Bistagno is a comune (municipality) in the Province of Alessandria in the Italian region Piedmont, located about  southeast of Turin and about  southwest of Alessandria.

Bistagno borders the following municipalities: Castelletto d'Erro, Melazzo, Monastero Bormida, Montabone, Ponti, Rocchetta Palafea, Sessame, and Terzo.

In the center of the village is the Giulio Monteverde Gipsothèque, which houses the sculptor's original plaster models.

Although the most common and widespread etymology for the toponym is connected with the confluence of two 'branches' of the Bormida river (the Spigno Bormida and the Millesimo Bormida) in the territory of Bistagno (Bistagno < bi + stagno, bi(s)- + pond, where 'pond' would not only indicate a stagnant body of water, but would be also connected with the root *agn- > Latin amnis, in the meaning of 'river', 'water course', 'stream', 'torrent'), a new etymology, based on linguistic evidence, connects Bistagno with *bĭst-ăgnŏ-s (Proto-Indo-European ~ Celtic), which would mean 'small pheasant', and would allude to the presence of this specific bird in the territory of the village in the Neolithic or, in any case, in prehistoric times.

People
 Giuseppe Saracco (1821–1907), politician
 Giulio Monteverde (1837–1917), sculptor

Twin towns
 Flaviac, France

References

Cities and towns in Piedmont